Planta de Beneficio is a rural inactive settlement 1 kilometer southwest of the town of San Jerónimo, Jalisco, Mexico. The area is adjacent to the Presa San Jerónimo, probably where its name comes from, "plant of benefit".

The river valley approximately west of the area is usually called La Joya, or "the jewel". Although the INEGI census of 2010 recorded the settlement with 0 inhabitants, the area counts with two houses and one agave field.

References

External links
Mapa de Referencia - Planta de Beneficio

Populated places in Jalisco